Masulita is a town in Wakiso District in the Central Region of Uganda. As of April 2021 Masulita is one of four town councils in the district.

Location

The geographical coordinates of the town are 0°30'44.0"N, 32°21'59.0"E (Latitude:0.5122; Longitude:32.3664).

Population
The 2002 national census enumerated the population of the town at 11,564. The national census of 27 August 2014 enumerated the population at 14,762.

In 2015, the Uganda Bureau of Statistics (UBOS) estimated the population of Masulita at 15,400. In 2020, the population agency estimated the mid-year population of the town at 21,300. Of these, 10,700 (50.2 percent) were male and 10,600 (49.8 percent) were female. UBOS calculated the average annual growth rate of the town's population at 6.7 percent, between 2015 and 2020.

Points of interest
The town is home to a number of Christian churches. It also hosts several primary schools. Masulita Secondary School is located in the middle of town. Masulita Central Market is situated at the south-eastern corner of the major road intersection in the center of the town.

See also
List of cities and towns in Uganda

References

Populated places in Central Region, Uganda
Wakiso District